Lutfur Rahman was a politician in Sylhet District of Bangladesh. He was elected a member of parliament of Bangladesh Nationalist Party candidate from Sylhet-6 (Golapgonj-Beanibazar) seat in the second parliamentary election of the 1979 year.

References

External links 

 List of 2nd Parliament Members- Jatiya Sangsad

2nd Jatiya Sangsad members
People from Sylhet District
Bangladesh Nationalist Party politicians